Wellsyke Wood is a small woodland on Roughton Moor to the east of the village of Woodhall Spa, Lincolnshire.

At the eastern end of the wood there is a small spring which feeds one of the two main sources of The Sewer (also known as Woodhall Sewer), a small stream that is a tributary of the River Witham at Kirkstead.

Forests and woodlands of Lincolnshire